Freedom of choice  is an individual's opportunity and autonomy to perform a chosen action unconstrained by external parties.

Freedom of choice may also refer to:

 Free will, the ability to choose between different possible courses of action unimpeded
 Freedom of Choice (album), a 1980 album by Devo
 "Freedom of Choice" (song)
 Freedom of Choice (schools), a number of plans developed in the United States 1965–1970
 Freedom of Choice Act, an American legislative abortion rights proposal

See also
 
 Freedom (disambiguation)
 Free Will (disambiguation)
 Free to Choose, a 1980 book and TV series by Milton and Rose Friedman